Atlanta is the capital and largest city in the state of Georgia. Atlanta ranks as the 38th-largest in the United States, and the sixth-largest city in the southeastern region. 2010 census results varied dramatically with previous Census Bureau estimates, counting 420,003 residents. Atlanta is the core city of the ninth most populous United States metropolitan area at 5,268,860 (est. 2010), with a combined statistical area of 5,626,400. A 2015 article, written by Nate Silver of fivethirtyeight.com, found that Atlanta was the second most segregated city in the U.S.

City of Atlanta

History
Atlanta's population grew steadily during the first 100 years of the city's existence, and peaked in 1970 at around 496,000. However, from 1970 to 2000, the city lost over 100,000 residents, a decrease of around 16 percent. During the same time, the metro area gained over three million people, cutting the city's share of the metro population in half, from over 25 percent in 1970 to around 12 percent in 2000. However, the city's population bottomed out in 1990 at around 394,000, and it has been increasing every year since then, reaching 420,003 residents in 2010. The population count for the 2020 census was 498,715, surpassing the 1970 population. https://www.census.gov/quickfacts/atlantacitygeorgia

2010 Census

Income
In 2009, the median income for a household in the city was $47,464 and the median income for a family was $59,711. About 21.8% of the population and 17.2% of families lived below the poverty line.

Race and ethnicity

The 2020, 2010, and 2000 composition of Atlanta by race, ethnicity and foreign-born status was as shown. Note that due to the way the census options for race and ethnicity were changed in 2020, there was a nationwide shift from those stating their race as a single race, to the "some other race" and multirace categories.

Atlanta is, as of 2010, the nation's 4th largest black-majority city and has long been known as a "black mecca" for its role as a center of black wealth, political and social power, education, and culture including film and music. 

The city of Atlanta is seeing a large demographic increase in its white population, and at a pace that outstrips the rest of the nation. The proportion of whites in the city's population grew faster between 2000 and 2006 than that of any other U.S. city. By 2010, Atlanta's white population had increased by 22,763 people. The white percentage increased from 31% in 2000, to 35% in 2006, to 38% in 2010, more than double the increase between 1990 and 2000. During the same time, the city's black population increased by 31,678 people, shrinking from 61.4% of the city's population in 2000 to 54.0% in 2010. The demographic changes are due to an influx of whites into gentrifying intown neighborhoods, such as East Atlanta and the Old Fourth Ward, coupled with a movement of blacks into adjacent suburbs, such as Clayton County. Note that this phenomenon is not unique to Atlanta, as Washington, D.C. is undergoing a similar demographic change.

The city of Atlanta has recently become relatively more diverse. The city long consisted overwhelmingly of non-Hispanic blacks and non-Hispanic whites; those groups made up 92.1% of the city in 1990, but by 2010 their proportion had shrunk to 85.0%. Atlanta's Hispanic population increased by 72.0% from 2000 to 2010, and in 2010 the city was 10.2% Hispanic. The Asian American population increased by 65.5%, and in 2010 Asian Americans made up 5.1% of the city. 

The trend towards ethnic diversity is much stronger in Metro Atlanta as a whole in which non-Hispanic blacks and non-Hispanic whites make up only 83.1% of the population. The metro area's Hispanic population more than doubled from 268,851 in 2000 to 547,400 in 2010, and now makes up over 10% of the region's population. These immigrant communities have altered the economic, cultural, and religious landscape of metro Atlanta. The Asian American population in the metro nearly doubled and makes up just under 5% of the region's population. Gwinnett County became one of the most diverse counties in the nation.

Race and ethnicity by neighborhood

2010 census figures for Atlanta's 25 neighborhood planning units reveal several key facts about Atlanta's neighborhoods:
 60% of the city's area consists of predominantly black neighborhoods: together, Northwest, Southwest, and Southeast Atlanta are 92% black
 there are some areas that are predominantly white, notably Buckhead and Northeast Atlanta (NPUs F and N) which are on average 80% white
 most of the fastest growing areas are central: Downtown (25.9%), Midtown, West Midtown, close-in east side neighborhoods (NPU N) (18.4%)
 the Ben Hill area at the southwest Perimeter is also growing quickly (up 5,452 people, 45.8%)
 population loss in areas of Northwest Atlanta (avg. -24.1%) and Southeast Atlanta (-20.5%), as well as some parts of Southwest Atlanta

Source:

Major shifts from 2000 to 2010
Rise in white population:
In NPU W (East Atlanta, Grant Park, Ormewood Park, Benteen Park), the black population went from 57.6% to 38.0%, and the white proportion rose from 36.5% to 54.8%
In NPU O (Edgewood, Kirkwood, East Lake area), the black population went from 86.2% to 58.7%, and the white proportion rose from 11.3% to 36.9%.
In NPU L (English Avenue, Vine City), the black proportion of the population went down from 97.5% to 89.1%, while the white proportion rose from 1.3% to 6.1%. Note that there many infill residential units were added in the King Plow Arts Center area, which falls under English Avenue but which in character is an extension of the Marietta Street Artery and West Midtown.
In NPU D, stretching from West Midtown along the border of Buckhead and northwestern Atlanta, westward towards the river, the white proportion rose from 49.3% to 59.2% with the black proportion dropping from 36.5% to 23.9%

Increasing black population:
In NPU X (Metropolitan Parkway corridor), the black proportion of the population rose from 59.5% to 83.2%, while the White, Asian and Hispanic proportion dropped about three percentage points each.
NPU B (central Buckhead) became more diverse, with the white proportion dropping from 82.8% to 75.5%, the black proportion rising from 5.9% to 12.3%, and the Asian proportion from 3.1% to 5.3%

Sexual orientation and marital status
The city of Atlanta has one of the highest LGBT populations per capita in the nation. It ranked third of all major cities, behind San Francisco   and slightly behind Seattle, with 12.8% of the city's total population recognizing themselves as gay, lesbian, or bisexual. Also, Atlanta is home to two highly attended and notable LGBT events, Atlanta Pride and Atlanta Black Pride.

According to the 2000 United States Census (revised in 2004), 
Atlanta had the twelfth highest proportion of single-person households nationwide among cities of 100,000 or more residents, which was at 38.5%.

Born out-of-state and foreign-born 
In the city of Atlanta, Ga. 53% of residents were born in Georgia, 19.1% elsewhere in the South, 18.6% outside the South and 8.0% in a foreign country. Although the foreign-born population in the city itself is low among large US cities and even compared to Atlanta's own metro area, it is high compared to other nearby Southern cities. For example, in Macon, Georgia, 7.1% were US-born outside the South and 3.0% foreign-born, and in Birmingham, Alabama only 7.7% were US-born outside the South and 3.2% foreign-born.

Daytime population
According to a 2000 daytime population estimate by the Census Bureau, over 250,000 more people commuted to Atlanta on any given workday, boosting the city's estimated daytime population to 676,431. This is an increase of 62.4% over Atlanta's resident population, making it the largest gain in daytime population in the country among cities with fewer than 500,000 residents.

Timeline
1850 - 2,572
City limits a circle with radius of 1 mile (3.14 mi2)

1860 - 9,554
1866 city limits enlarged to a radius of 1.5 miles (7 mi2) 

1870 - 21,789

1880 - 37,409
 had eclipsed Savannah to become Georgia's largest city
1889 city limits enlarged to a radius of 1.75 miles, Inman Park also annexed.  (9.6 mi2)

1890 - 65,533
1894 annexation of West End (adding 1.0 mi2 for a total of 11 mi2)

1900 - 89,872, including 2500 persons of foreign birth and 35,900 of African descent.
1909: annexation of Edgewood, Reynoldstown, East Atlanta, Copenhill and part of Druid Hills

1910 - 154,839 (metro 522,442)
1910: annexation of 5.5 mi2 to the north and west and 3.2 mi2 to the southwest and south including Oakland City

1920 - 200,616 (metro 622,283)

1930 - 270,688 (metro 715,391)

1940 - 302,288 (metro 820,579)

1950 - 331,314 (metro 997,666)
1952: annexation of 80 mi2 in Buckhead, Adams Park, Southwest Atlanta & Lakewood, adding 100,000 people (total city area 130 mi2)

1960 - 487,455 (metro 1,312,474)

1970 - 496,973 (metro 1,763,626)

1980 - 425,022 (metro 2,233,324)

1990 - 394,017 (metro 2,959,950)

2000 - 416,474 (metro 4,112,198)

2010 - 420,003 (metro 5,268,860)

Political implications
Atlanta's changing demographics have had effects on its political system. In the 2009 mayoral race, Mary Norwood lost by just 714 votes (out of over 84,000 cast) to Kasim Reed. Norwood, who is white, would have become the city's first non-black mayor since 1974. This comes amid the fact that in recent years, an influx of whites, Asians and Hispanics into Atlanta has shifted the demographics in what was once a city guaranteed to elect a black mayor. In fact, the percentage of blacks dropped to 54 percent in 2010 from 61 percent in 2000. This demographic change and its possible historic effect on Atlanta's city government was a factor that, among others, helped draw supporters of both candidates to the polls.

Projections
Atlanta is projected to have a population of around 590,000 people by 2030. However, this projection assumes Atlanta garners only seven percent of the metro's growth during that period. If the city were to capture ten percent of metro Atlanta's growth, it would reach a population of 660,000 people by 2030.

Metro Atlanta

 Atlanta MSA in 2000 did not include Butts, Dawson, Haralson, Heard, Jasper, Lamar, Meriwether, and Pike counties, whose population totalled in 2000: 135,783; in 2010: 156,368 (2.96% of total new 28-county metro) Compares the larger 28-county Atlanta-Sandy Springs-Marietta MSA 2010 with a smaller 20-county Atlanta MSA 2000; however the 8 new counties represent less than 3% of the larger 28-county metro.Source: for race and Hispanic population, U.S. Census Bureau 2010 and 2000 census; for foreign-born population: US Census Bureau 2010 and 2000 American Community Surveys; Immigrants in 2010 Metropolitan America, Brookings Institution

Race and ethnicity
The 2010 census counted 5,268,860 people in the 28-county metro area. This was an increase of 1,020,879 versus the same 28-county area in 2000, second only to Houston. The percent increase was 24.0%, second-highest (after Houston) among the nation's ten largest metro areas. 

White Americans made up 55.4% of metro Atlanta's population, a relative decrease from 63.0% ten years earlier, but still an absolute increase of over 330,000 people. Non-Hispanic whites dropped from 59.5% to 50.7% of the metro's population, increasing by about 224,000 people.

Black Americans are the largest racial minority with 32.4% of the population, up from 28.9% in 2000. The city of Atlanta has long been regarded as a "black mecca" for its role as a center of black education, political power, wealth, and culture. From 2000 to 2010, the geographic disbursement of blacks in Metro Atlanta changed radically. Long concentrated in the city of Atlanta and DeKalb County, the black population there dropped while over half a million African Americans settled across other parts of the metro area, including approximately 112,000 in Gwinnett County, 71,000 in Fulton outside Atlanta, 58,000 in Cobb, 50,000 in Clayton, 34,000 in Douglas, and 27,000 each in Newton and Rockdale Counties.

Hispanic Americans are the fastest growing ethnic group. At 10.4% of the metro's population in 2010, versus only 6.5% in 2000, the metro's Hispanic population increased an astounding 103.6%, or 278,459 people, in ten years. Major Hispanic groups include 314,351 Mexicans, 43,337 Puerto Ricans and 17,648 Cubans. All of those groups' populations increased by over 90% in the ten-year period. Of the metro's 279,000-person increase in the Hispanic population from 2000 to 2010, 98,000 came in Gwinnett County, 37,000 in Cobb, 25,000 in Fulton (all but 3,000 outside the city of Atlanta), 20,000 in Hall, and 15,000 in DeKalb County. The Hispanic population is heavily concentrated in the northeastern section of the Atlanta metropolitan Area.

The Asian American population also increased rapidly from 2000 to 2010. There were 256,956 Asian Americans in the metro area in 2010, making up 4.9% of the population. This represented an 87% increase over 2000. The largest Asian groups are 78,980 Indians, 43,870 Koreans, 37,660 Chinese and 36,554 Vietnamese.

Atlanta has Georgia's largest Bosnian American population with approximately 10,000 in the metro area, mainly in Gwinnett County and DeKalb County

The most common reported ancestries in Atlanta were English, American, German, Irish, Italian, Scottish, African, French, Polish, Russian and Dutch.

109,023 Italians live in the Atlanta area.

There is a small Romani community in Atlanta.

There is a substantial Mexican population in Atlanta. Mexicans are concentrated in Gwinnett County.

Jamaicans are concentrated in Stone Mountain, Decatur, Lithonia and Snellville.

Ethiopians and Eritreans are present in Atlanta.

There is a small Japanese community in the metro Atlanta area.

There is a Brazilian community in the metro Atlanta area. Brazilians are concentrated in Marietta, Sandy Springs and Alpharetta.

There is a Nigerian community in Atlanta. Nigerians are concentrated in DeKalb County.

There is an Iranian presence in Atlanta. Cobb County is home to the largest population of Iranians in Atlanta.

About 9,400 Cubans live in the Atlanta area. Approximately 4,900 were born in Cuba. DeKalb County has the largest Cuban population in Atlanta.

Foreign-born population
Metro Atlanta is increasingly international, with its 716,434 foreign-born residents in 2010, a 69% increase versus 2000. This was the fourth largest rate of growth among the nation's top 100 metros, after Baltimore, Orlando and Las Vegas. The foreign-born proportion of the population went up from 10.3% to 13.6%, and Atlanta moved up from 14th to 12th in ranking of US metro areas with the largest immigrant population by sheer numbers. Still, its 13.6% proportion of immigrants is only the 29th highest of the nation's top 100 metros.

Metro Atlanta's immigrants are more suburban than most other cities'. Out of the top 100 US metros, Atlanta has the 11th highest ratio of the foreign-born living in the suburbs and not in the core city. Atlanta does not have single centers of ethnic groups such as a Koreatown, but rather areas such as the Buford Highway Corridor in DeKalb County and parts of Gwinnett County are commercial centers for multiple ethnic communities.

In 1990 Greater Atlanta had the largest Japanese population in the Southeast United States. The Consulate General of Japan in Atlanta estimated that, during that year, 3,500 to 4,000 Japanese lived in Greater Atlanta. Of the metropolitan areas in the Southeast United States, in 1990 Greater Atlanta had the most extensive education network for Japanese nationals.

8% of the foreign born population in Atlanta is black. Cobb County has the largest Haitian population. Nigerians are concentrated in DeKalb County.

3.2 percent of immigrants in Atlanta were born in Jamaica and are Jamaican.

In the Atlanta-Sandy Springs-
Marietta, GA area the African foreign born population came from Nigeria, Ethiopia, Ghana, Kenya, Liberia, South Africa, Somalia, Cameroon
Sierra Leone and Togo.

There is an Eritrean community in Atlanta.

Religion

Religion in Atlanta, while historically centered around Protestant Christianity, now involves many faiths as a result of the city and metro area's increasingly international population. While Protestant Christianity still maintains a strong presence in the city (63%), in recent decades Catholicism has gained a strong foothold due to migration patterns. Metro Atlanta also has a considerable number of ethnic Christian congregations, including Korean and Indian churches. Large non-Christian faiths are present in the form of Islam, Judaism, and Hinduism. Overall, there are over 1,000 places of worship within Atlanta.

Language

In 2008, approximately 83.3% of the population five years and older spoke only English at home, which is roughly 4,125,000 people. Over 436,000 people (8.8%) spoke Spanish at home, making Metro Atlanta the 15th highest number of Spanish speakers among American metropolitan areas (MSAs). Over 193,000 people (3.9%) spoke other Indo-European languages at home. People who speak an Asian language at home numbered over 137,000 and made up 2.8% of the population.

References

External links
History of Atlanta 1782-1900s
Atlanta region population
Demographia.com

 
Atlanta
Culture of Atlanta
Geography of Atlanta
Economy of Atlanta
History of Atlanta
Atlanta